Ridin' Wild can refer to:

Ridin' Wild (1922 film), a 1922 American silent film
Ridin' Wild (1925 film), a 1925 American silent film

See also
Riding Wild, a 1935 American western directed by David Selman